Commodore Babru Bhan Yadav, MVC (14 September 1928 – 22 January 2010), also known as B.B. Yadav, was a former Indian Navy Officer. He led the 25th Missile Boat Squadron during Operation Trident in the Indo-Pakistani War of 1971.

Early life and education
He was born in the village Bharawas in the Rewari district of Haryana to Major Bhagwan Singh Yadav. His father is known for taking part in both world wars. Yadav studied from Banares Hindu University and completed his graduation from St. Stephen's College in Delhi in 1947.

Military career
Yadav joined Indian Navy on 1 January 1951 at the age of 23. He received his training from United Kingdom. He also went to Russia for training. He was the first Naval officer to be awarded the Maha Vir Chakra award for gallantry in the 1971 war.

He received the Maha Vir Chakra for his exceptional leadership and military skills which led to the destruction of Pakistan's most powerful naval regiment at the  Karachi Naval base in the 1971 war. The Karachi Strike Group formed for Operation Trident and Operation Python was under his command. The strike group is also known as the Killer Squadron as India gained Naval supremacy over Pakistan in 1971 war. In memory of both the operations Indian Navy celebrates Navy Day on 4 December every year.

Later life
Yadav served as the state Director of National Cadet Corps in Chandigarh for Punjab, Himachal Pradesh and Haryana. He retired from the navy in 1982. He later worked in the Merchant Navy. He died in Delhi, aged 81.

References

1928 births
2010 deaths
Indian Navy officers
People from Haryana